David P. Handlin is an American architect and architectural historian.

Life and career 
Handlin was born in Boston, the son of the historian Oscar Handlin and his first wife, Mary Flug Handlin. He studied at Harvard University and the Harvard Graduate School of Design and earned a doctorate from Cambridge University.

He was a lecturer in architecture at Cambridge from 1973 to 1978 and an associate professor in architecture at the Harvard Graduate School of design from 1973 to 1978. He later founded the architecture firm of Handlin, Garrahan, Zachos and Associates in Cambridge, Massachusetts, of which he is president.

Handlin has written two survey books, The American Home, Architecture and Society, 1815–1915 and American Architecture. He has been characterized as a conservative architectural historian.

Publications 
 The American Home, Architecture and Society, 1815–1915. Boston: Little, Brown, 1979. .
 American Architecture. World of Art. London: Thames and Hudson, 1985. . Rev. ed. 2004. .

References

External links 
Handlin, Garrahan and Associates

Harvard Graduate School of Design alumni
Alumni of the University of Cambridge
Harvard Graduate School of Design faculty
Academics of the University of Cambridge
20th-century American architects
21st-century American architects
Living people
Year of birth missing (living people)